Mynett is a surname. Notable people with the surname include:

 Alan Mynett (born 1966), English cricketer
 Ted Mynett (1900–1961), English railwayman

See also
 Minette (disambiguation)
 Mylett, surname